Jodhpur is a city and a municipality in Ahmedabad district in the Indian state of Gujarat.

Geography
It has an average elevation of 98 metres (321 feet).

Demographics
 India census, Jodhpur had a population of 44,381. Males constitute 52% of the population and females 48%. Jodhpur has an average literacy rate of 83%, higher than the national average of 59.5%: male literacy is 86%, and female literacy is 80%. In Jodhpur, 9% of the population is under 6 years of age.

References

Neighbourhoods in Ahmedabad